Kharkiv National University of Arts named after I. P. Kotlyarevsky (or Kharkiv Conservatory or Kharkiv National I. P. Kotlyarevsky University of Arts) is the leading music and drama institution of higher education in Ukraine. The university trains about 900 undergraduates, graduates and postgraduates in music and theatre art. It enjoys Level IV accreditation, which is the highest under Ukraine's national standards, and is licensed to train foreign students.

History
The roots of the university can be traced back to the musical classes opened in 1871 under the aegis of the Kharkiv branch of the Russian Imperial Music Society. Kharkiv Conservatory was established in 1917, a result of professional music education development in Kharkiv. Prominent among those who stood at the origins of the conservatory were P. Tchaikovsky, O. Glazunov, and I. Slatin. The conservatory was several times renamed. Since 1920 it was known as Music Academy, but in 1923 with the opening of theatre major the academy was turned into the Institute of Music and Drama, and later into Kharkiv State Conservatory (1934) and Institute of Arts (1963). All these names reflect the search for the most optimal model of artistic education.

In 2004 the institute was awarded the university status and the highest Level IV accreditation. That was another step into the future; it confirmed integration into the European system of education and contributed to the strengthening of the university's international credibility. On the occasion of its 90th anniversary the university was awarded the Diploma of the Cabinet of Ministry of Ukraine and a gold medal of the Academy of Arts of Ukraine. In 2011 it was given the status of 'national importance'.

Directors and rectors 

Slatin I.I. (1917–1920)
Lutsenko P.K. (1920–1921)
Roslavets  N. А. (1921–1923)
Polfiorov Ya. Ya. (1924–1925)
Dremtsov S. P. (1927–1927)
Grudyna D. А. (1927–1934)
Dyakovska N. R. (1934–1941)
Bogatyrev S. S. (May–October 1941)
Komarenko V. А. (1941–1944)
Borysov V. Т. (1944–1949)
Kurochkin F. Ya. (1949–1951)
Lebedinets А. D. (1951–1962)
Nakhabin V. N. (1962–1967)
Korniyenko V. S. (1967–1975)
Averyanov G. B. (1975–1991)
Ignatchenko G. I. (1991–2003)
Verkina Т. B. (2004–2020)

Facilities 
The university occupies two buildings: Conservatory and Theatre Department.

Conservatory, the main building, houses three halls (Big Hall, Chamber Hall and Small Hall), an opera studio, practice rooms, lecture rooms, a computer class and administrative offices. The building also has a library with about 240 000 depository items; a record and video library with more than 15000 records on CDs and DVDs, audio and video cassettes and vinyl records; an educational folklore laboratory created with the aim to collect, explore and preserve traditional music artefacts of Sloboda Ukraine (Slobozhanshchina).

Theatre Department is a smaller building which includes a big auditorium for drama performances, a small auditorium for puppet performances, rehearsal rooms, lecture rooms, dance rooms, a library, and a puppet's work-room.

Courses/Programs 
Kharkiv National I. P. Kotlyarevsky University of Arts offers preparatory courses majoring in academic singing and theatre art as well as full-time and part-time courses for BA and MA degrees in Music Art and Theatre Art. The undergraduate degree programs take four years and the graduate degree programs – 1 year

Academic majors are piano, strings, brass, woodwinds, folk instruments, variety arts and jazz, composition, orchestral and choral conducting, organ, percussion, academic singing, musicology, theatre studies, drama and cinema acting, stage directing, acting and directing of the theatre of animation.

Admissions 
Admission into the university is by a live audition and interview (bachelor's degree). To get a master's degree foreign students must defend a qualification paper and take an exam in the Ukrainian (or Russian) language.

Structure

Faculty of Musicology and Performance 
The Faculty of Musicology and Performance has rich professional traditions followed by its leading specialists in the field of musicology, composition and performance.

Degree-granting departments:
Special Piano
Concertmaster's Skills
Chamber Ensemble
Theory of Music
History of Ukrainian and Foreign Music
Interpretology and Analysis of Music
Composition and Orchestration
Choral Conducting
Solo Singing
Opera Studies

Orchestra Faculty 
The Orchestra Faculty established by a prominent musician and cultural professional I.І. Statin offers educational opportunities in performance studies to help students develop their creativity and to prepare them for careers in music.

Degree-granting departments:
Chamber Ensemble and Quartet
Orchestra String Instruments
Orchestra Wind and Percussion Instruments and Opera and Symphony Conducting
Folk instruments of Ukraine
Instruments of Variety Orchestra

Theatre Faculty 
Theatre education provided by Kharkiv National University of Arts has always been very prestigious. Its deep long-standing traditions took shape under the influence of L. Kurbas, I. Maryanenko, D. Antonovich, M. Krushelnytsky, V. Afanasyev, A. Pletnyov and A. Gorbenko and many other famous coryphaei of theatre art. Notable alumni of the faculty work all over the world including Kyiv, Moscow and St. Petersburg.

Degree-granting departments:
Stage Directing
Performing skills
Performing skills and Stage Directing of the Theatre of Animation
Theatre Studies.

Postgraduate Department 
The Postgraduate Studies Office opened in 1993 in Kharkiv State I.P. Kotlyarevsky University of Arts provides training in speciality 17.00.03 – "Music Art" and postgraduate internship course in specialities 17.00.03 – "Music Art" and 17.00.02 – "Theater Art". In 2008 I.P. Kotlyarevsky University of Arts opened a Centre for Doctoral Training.

University postgraduate internship centre is a real school of performing and teaching skills. Some postgraduate internship trainees are engaged in research work. During the study they take PhD exams, participate in research conferences and after completing the postgraduate course program they get an additional year to get ready for the thesis defense.

Duration of study at the Postgraduate Studies Department is 4 years, post-graduate internship department – 2 years.

The university offers internship in higher education institutions of Poland.

Performing ensembles and companies  
Kharkiv University of Arts has a variety of student performance ensembles.
Student Symphony Orchestra of Kharkiv National I. P. Kotlyarevsky University of Arts founded in 1921 performs works by West-European, Ukrainian and Russian composers. It is a regular participant of numerous national and international festivals.
Folk Orchestra is an award winner of Hnat Khotkevych International competitions and the festival of Ministry of Culture and Arts of Ukraine. The repertoire includes pieces by West-European, Russian, Ukrainian classics and modern composers.
Bandurist chorus was founded in 1996.  It gives a great number of concerts in Philharmonic Societies and theaters all over Ukraine. The repertoire presents a two-part program of songs in Ukrainian, Belarusian and Russian, original arrangements of folk songs, vocal and orchestral pieces.
Bayan orchestra started performing in 1993. The repertoire of the orchestra includes classical, folk, variety and jazz music as well as brilliant arrangements.
Chamber orchestra was founded in 1967 by the Honored Worker of Arts of Ukraine, Professor Suren Kocharyan. This orchestra is the prize winner of the republican competition and Malta International Music Festival, "Kyiv Spring", "Young Voices" and "Golden Autumn" Festivals; it toured almost all around the USSR including Kyiv, Riga, Lviv and Moscow. The orchestra collaborated with the most notable soloists and composers. Today its repertoire, along with the pieces of Baroque and classical music, includes pieces of the greatest Ukrainian composers V. Borisov, I. Kovach, D. Klebanov, V. Bibik, V. Ptushkin.
Student choir is a professional level choir consisting of graduates and advanced undergraduates. The repertoire includes masterpieces of national and world choral classics, sacred music, choral pearls of modern Ukrainian and foreign composers. 
Opera studio of Kharkiv National I. P. Kotlyarevsky University of Arts, which is more than 70 years old, is a youth opera house with an interesting repertoire and professional level performances that have become a part of national music and theater culture. The studio is always in search for experiments, and every year it produces a new show. The repertoire includes the best operas by Ukrainian, Russian and European composers.  
Educational theatre "The Fifth Floor" has more than a dozen of plays diverse both in the sense of dramaturgy (from national and international classics to the avant-garde of the 20th century) and in terms of performance style. Students of the theatre faculty produce performances staged not only by their professors, but also by the most successful students of stage directing departments.

International partnership 
Kharkiv University of Arts actively establishes partnerships with the main educational institutions all over the world. It actively participates in international collaboration with arts schools in Cincinnati (USA), Nuremberg, Leipzig (Germany), Naples (Italy), Geneva (Switzerland), Helsinki (Finland), Brussels (Belgium), Lublin (Poland), Vancouver (Canada), Moscow, St. Petersburg, Rostov-on-Don  (Russia) as well as music colleges of Spain and drama schools of Poland, France, Russia, etc. Besides, the university maintains active partnerships with Goethe-Institute in Ukraine, French Cultural Center, Consulate General of Poland and Russia, Austrian and Swiss Embassies in Ukraine, British Council, and Rotary Clubs. It has formalized partnership agreements with universities of Russia, Belarus, Georgia, Lithuania, Poland and China. Concert tours, workshops and research symposia are arranged within these agreements. Such renowned musicians as Sergei Krivonos (USA), Krzysztof Penderecki, Grzegorz Syerochynsky (Poland), Timothy Reynish (Great Britain), Burkhard Rempe (Germany), and Volodymyr Lukashev (Ukraine) are honourable Doctors of Kharkov National I. P. Kotlyarevsky University of Arts.

Professors 
Altukhov Valeriy — clarinettist
Borysov, Valentyn — composer.

Klebanov, Dmitri — composer
Kravtsov, Taras — musicologist, composer.
Maryanenko, Ivan — stage director, lecturer
Tiumeneva, Galyna — musicologist.
Korovay, Feodor — professor, folk instruments department
Tyts, Mykhailo — musicologist, composer.
Voinov, Arkadiy Vasyliovych – professor, Honoured Artist of Ukraine
Zolotovytska, Irma — musicologist.
Zolotukhin, Volodymyr — composer.

Notable alumni

 Babich, Nataliya — choirmaster
 Bevz, Maryna — pianist
 Bibik Valentyn — composer
 Borysov, Valentyn — composer
 Bulgakov, Lev — composer
 Bykov, Leonid — actor
 Dmitriieva, Oksana – chief director of the Kharkiv Puppet Theater
 Dubinin, Andriy — singer
 Dunayevsky, Isaak — composer.
 Fateyeva Natalia — actress
 Finarovsky, Gryhoriy — composer
 Gmyrya,  Boris — singer
 Gusarova, Olga — musicologist.
 Hansburg, Gryhoriy — musicologist
 Hanzburg, Isroel — trombonist
 Hetmansky Oleh — actor
 Horbenko, Anatoliy  — theatre critic
 Dursenieva, Oleksandra  — opera singer, mezzo-soprano, soloist in Bolshoi Theatre
 Karmynsky, Mark — composer.
 Klebanov, Dmitri — composer
 Kolodub, Lev – composer.
 Koval, Mykola — singer (baritone)
 Kravtsov, Taras — musicologist, composer.
 Kramarenko Serhiy – Laureate of the VI Allunion contest of Variety art performers, Honoured Artist of Russia
 Kudriats, Yevhen — choirmaster, journalist
 Leontyev, Pavlo — conductor
 Lezhneva, Olga — actress
 Manoilo, Mykola — singer
 Mashchenko, Mykola Pavlovych — actor
 Merkuryev, Petro — choirmaster
 Myroshnychenko, Viktor — stage director and actor. People's Artist of the Ukrainian SSR.
 Muzhchil, Viktor — composer.
 Palkin, Vyacheslav — choirmaster, composer
 Paster, Maksym — opera singer, tenor, soloist in Bolshoi Theatre
 Petrenko, Olexiy — actor
 Piliutikov, Serhiy — composer
 Ruslanova, Nina — actress
 Serfdiuk, Les — actor
 Shcherbynin, Yuriy — musicologist
 Shchetynsky, Oleksandr — composer
 Tsipola, Guesella Albertovna — opera singer
 Tyts, Mykhailo — musicologist, composer
 Tolba, Veniamin — conductor
 Tiumeneva, Galyna — musicologist
 Topchii, Marko — guitarist
 Yarovynsky, Borys — composer
 Urytskyi, Mykhailo — puppet theater director.
 Verkina, Tatiana — pianist
 Zhubinskaya, Valentine Yanovna – composer
 Zolotovytska, Irma — musicologist.
 Zolotukhin, Volodymyr — composer.

External links 
 

Music schools in Ukraine
1917 establishments in Ukraine
Universities and colleges in Kharkiv
Culture in Kharkiv
National universities in Ukraine
Buildings and structures destroyed during the 2022 Russian invasion of Ukraine